Norman Wykes (19 March 1906 – 4 December 1991) was an English cricketer. He was educated at Oundle School and played for Essex between 1925 and 1936.

References

External links

1906 births
1991 deaths
English cricketers
Essex cricketers
People from Woodford, London
Cambridge University cricketers
People educated at Oundle School